Nilsdotter is a patronymic. Notable people with the surname include:

 Christina Nilsdotter (died 1399), Swedish singer and song teacher
 Karin Nilsdotter (c. 1551–1613), royal mistress of Charles IX of Sweden
 Kristina Nilsdotter (died 1254), Swedish noblewoman
 Margareta Nilsdotter (died 1630), Swedish businessperson and shipbuilder
 Maria Nilsdotter i Ölmeskog (1756–1822), Swedish farmer